= Aguadu Cliffs =

Cliffs in Melilla, Spain

- Beach
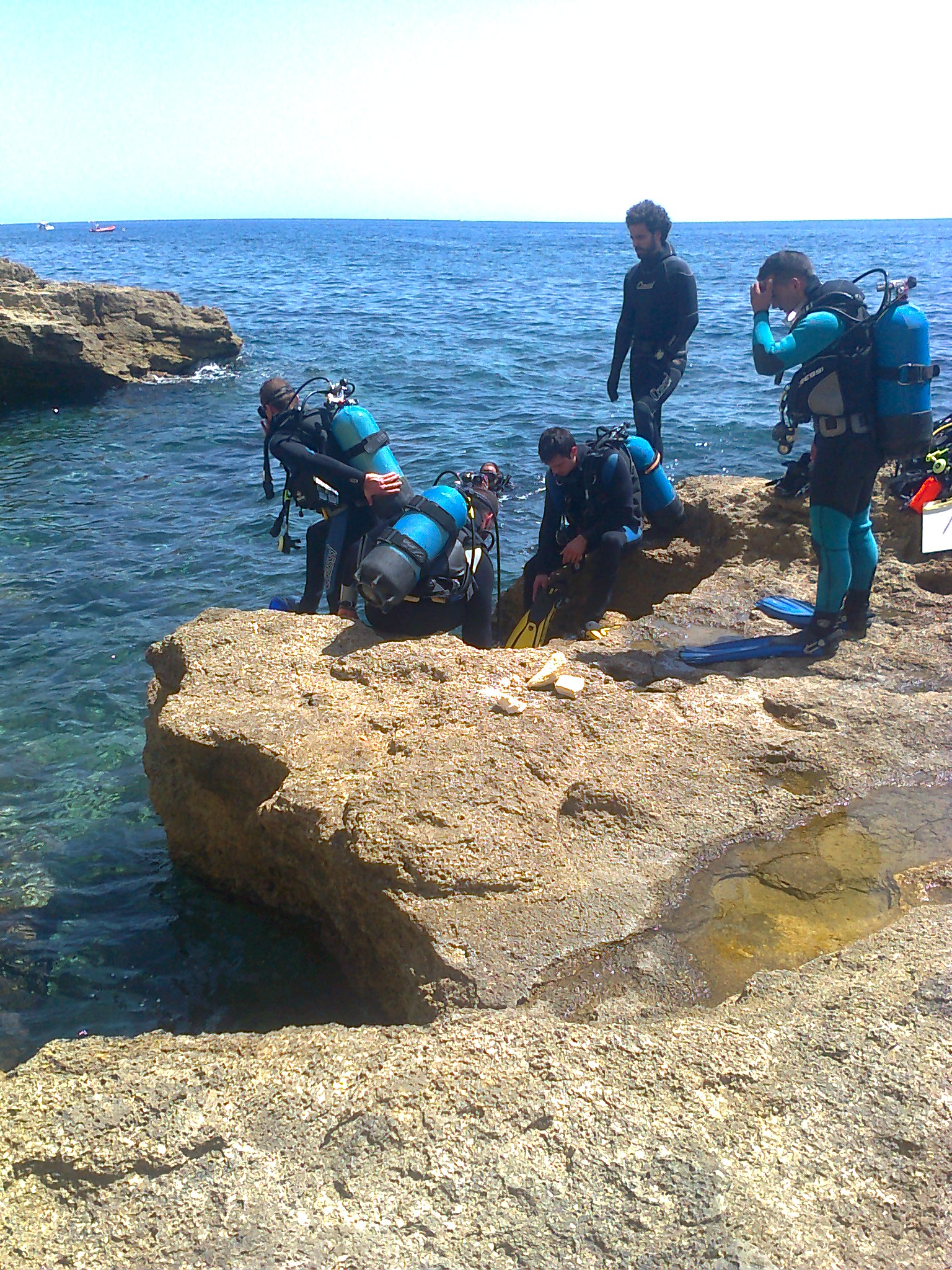
- Interactive map of Aguadu Cliffs
- Coordinates: 35.3142°N 2.9448°W
- Location: Melilla, Spain

Aguadu Cliffs (Spanish: Acantilados de Aguadú) is located in Melilla, Spain. The cliffs are composed of stones. It has "Blue Flag" status, which confirms the good water quality.
